Unedogemmula is a genus of sea snails, marine gastropod mollusks in the family Turridae, the turrids.

Distribution
Species in this genus occur in the Indo-West Pacific and off Australia.

Species
Species within the genus Unedogemmula include:
 † Unedogemmula annae (Hoernes & Auinger, 1891)
 † Unedogemmula bemmeleni (Oostingh, 1941) 
 Unedogemmula bisaya (B. M. Olivera, 2004)
 †  Unedogemmula boreoturricula (F. Kautsky, 1925) 
 †  Unedogemmula contigua (G.B. Brocchi, 1814 ) 
 Unedogemmula deshayesii (Doumet, 1840)
 †  Unedogemmula hanseata (F. Kautsky, 1925) 
 Unedogemmula hazarti T. Cossignani, 2021
 Unedogemmula ina McNeil, 1961
 Unedogemmula indica (Röding, 1798)
 Unedogemmula koolhoveni (Oostingh, 1938) 
 † Unedogemmula nuttalli Harzhauser, Raven & Landau, 2018 
 † Unedogemmula sondeiana (K. Martin, 1895) 
 † Unedogemmula stoffelsi (P. Nyst, 1845) 
 Unedogemmula unedo (Kiener, 1839)
Synonyms
 Unedogemmula binda (T.A. Garrard, 1961): synonym of Unedogemmula unedo (Kiener, 1839)
 Unedogemmula elongata J.E. Gray & G.B. I Sowerby, 1839: synonym of Unedogemmula deshayesii (E. Doumet, 1840)
 Unedogemmula trypanodes J.C. Melvill, 1904:synonym of Gemmula hastula (L.A. Reeve, 1843)

References

 MacNeil F. S. (1961 ["1960"]) Tertiary and Quaternary Gastropoda of Okinawa. United States Geological Survey Professional Paper 339: iv + 148 pp., 21 pls.
 Powell AWB (1966), The Molluscan Families Speightiidae and Turridae; Bulletin of the Auckland Institute and Museum n. 5
 Bouchet P., Kantor Yu.I., Sysoev A. & Puillandre N. (2011) A new operational classification of the Conoidea. Journal of Molluscan Studies 77: 273-308.
 Wilson, B. 1994. Australian marine shells. Prosobranch gastropods. Kallaroo, WA : Odyssey Publishing Vol. 2 370 pp. 

Turridae